Mikia is a genus of flies in the family Tachinidae.

Species
M. apicalis (Matsumura, 1916)
M. choui Wang & Zhang, 2012
M. japanica (Baranov, 1935)
M. lampros (van der Wulp, 1896)
M. orientalis Chao & Zhou, 1998
M. patellipalpis (Mesnil, 1953)
M. tepens (Walker, 1849)
M. yunnanica Chao & Zhou, 1998

References

Tachininae
Tachinidae genera
Taxa named by Ferdinand Kowarz